Saharat Pongsuwan (born 11 June 1996) is a Thai professional footballer who plays as a left back for Thai League 1 club PT Prachuap.

Honours

Club
BG Pathum United
 Thai League 1: 2020–21
 Thai League 2: 2019
 Thailand Champions Cup: 2022

References

1996 births
Living people
Saharat Pongsuwan
Saharat Pongsuwan
Association football defenders
Saharat Pongsuwan
Saharat Pongsuwan
Saharat Pongsuwan